Diadegma argyloplocevora is a wasp first described by Tohru Uchida in 1932.  No subspecies are listed.

References

argyloplocevora
Insects described in 1932